The 1998 Basque Pelota World Championships were the 13th edition of the Basque Pelota World Championships organized by  the FIPV.

Participating nations

Others

Events
A total of 14 events were disputed, in 4 playing areas.

Trinquete, 6 events disputed

Fronton (30 m), 3 events disputed

Fronton (36 m), 4 events disputed

Fronton (54 m), 1 event disputed

Medal table

References

Basque pelota competitions in Mexico
1998 in sports
Sport in Mexico City
International sports competitions hosted by Mexico
1998 in Mexican sports
1998 in basque pelota